Skydive! is the eleventh novel in World of Adventure series by Gary Paulsen. It was published on May 2, 1996 by Random House.

Plot
The story is about 13-year-old Jesse Rodriguez who has an exciting job working for his friend Buck at a small flight and skydiving school near Seattle. But he can't wait to turn 16 and finally be able to make his first free-fall jump from a plane.

1996 American novels
Novels by Gary Paulsen
American young adult novels
Random House books
Aviation novels